The Best Coach/Manager ESPY Award has been presented annually since 1993 to the head coach or manager of a team contesting play in a professional North American or collegiate sports league adjudged to be the best in a given calendar year.

Between 1993 and 2004, the award voting panel comprised variously fans; sportswriters and broadcasters, sports executives, and retired sportspersons, termed collectively experts; and ESPN personalities, but balloting thereafter has been exclusively by fans over the Internet from amongst choices selected by the ESPN Select Nominating Committee.
Through the 2001 iteration of the ESPY Awards, ceremonies were conducted in February of each year to honor achievements over the previous calendar year; awards presented thereafter are conferred in July and reflect performance from the June previous. The award wasn't awarded in 2020 due to the COVID-19 pandemic.

List of winners

See also
Jack Adams Award
MLS Coach of the Year Award
Major League Baseball Manager of the Year Award, The Sporting News Manager of the Year Award
National Basketball Association Coach of the Year Award
National Football League Coach of the Year Award
Clair Bee Coach of the Year Award, Henry Iba Award, Naismith College Coach of the Year Award (collegiate basketball)
Paul "Bear" Bryant Award, Walter Camp Coach of the Year Award, Bobby Dodd Coach of the Year Award (collegiate football)

Notes

References

ESPY Awards
Coaching awards
Awards established in 1993